Kessleria burmanni is a moth of the family Yponomeutidae. It is found in Switzerland, Austria and Slovenia.

The length of the forewings is 7–8.4 mm for males and 4.5–6.5 mm for females. The forewings are grey to brown with white scales. The hindwings are dark greyish brown. Adults are on wing from the beginning of July to the end of August.

The larvae feed on Saxifraga caesia, Saxifraga oppositifolia and possibly Saxifraga hiflora macropetala. They have a dark greenish brown body and blackish brown head.

References

Moths described in 1992
Yponomeutidae